Ruiban, also rendered as Rubian, may refer to:
 Ruiban-e Bozorg
 Ruiban-e Kuchak